Free Grace United is a Baptist evangelical  multisite church affiliated with Converge North Central in Elk River, Minnesota. Free Grace United is one church with 24 locations throughout Minnesota, Iowa, Kenya, and Pakistan with a vision to launch 100 churches by 2040. Each church operates under the same name, mission, values, and statement of faith, but meet in different cities with different pastors. Each FGU church features live preaching.

Values and beliefs 
The mission of Free Grace United is to "help as many people as we can cross the line of faith and follow Jesus." Senior Pastor Eric Dykstra expresses that Free Grace United is "always, only about Jesus,"  and focuses on reaching out to the community with the Gospel. Free Grace United's Statement of Faith is available on its website, as well as its code of values. Sermon outlines are the same at each location, though preached live by different pastors, and are mostly written exegetically working through books of the Bible.

History 
In 2004, Eric and Kelly Dykstra were sent by Grace Fellowship Church in Brooklyn Park, MN to lead an Elk River church plant, Woodland Fellowship. In October, The Crossing at Woodland Fellowship held its first Grand Opening at  Marcus Theatres’ Elk River Cinema.

2005 - The Crossing added a Celebrate Recovery ministry, a 12-step faith-based recovery group that welcomed people struggling with "hurts, habits, and hang-ups".

2009 - The first permanent location of The Crossing at Woodland Fellowship was purchased across the street from Elk River High School. The church's name was abbreviated to "The Crossing," and plans were initiated to expand the church into neighboring cities. In October of 2009, The Crossing's first satellite campus was launched at Westwood Elementary in Zimmerman, Minnesota.

2010 - In February, The Crossing committed to fully support an orphanage in Haiti after the January earthquake that left the country devastated. In June, the first THRILL+MOVE Conference was held at the Elk River Campus. The new Big Lake Campus launched in September at a bar called The Friendly Buffalo in Big Lake, Minnesota. The church made local news when it gave away four pairs of Vikings season tickets on the opening weekend of its series "First & Goal."  

2011 - A permanent location was purchased for the Zimmerman church in May. 

2013 - The Crossing changed its tagline from "church for people who don’t do church" to "Guilt free. Grace full."

2014 - In February, The Elk River location's remodel and expansion opened, providing greater lobby space, a larger auditorium, and more parking. The church opened Free Grace Bible College to help laypeople learn more about and practice their Christian faith. 

2015 - The St. Cloud location of FGU launched in February.  

2016 - In January, the church celebrated the launch of the St. Michael location in the newly opened St. Michael Cinema. 

2018 - The church launched five new locations throughout the Twin Cities area.

2019 - The church changed its name to "Free Grace United" on March 31, 2019, to reflect a new ministry philosophy. This year the church also added a ministry to inmates at the Mille Lacs County Jail. 

2020 - Free Grace United offered online-only church from March 22 through June 1 due to the COVID-19 pandemic.

2021 - A church in Downtown Minneapolis (Grace in the City) became a Free Grace United location in January. The church also purchased and renovated a former movie theater to use as a meeting space in Milaca, MN. In August, the St Paul location of Free Grace United became an independent, autonomous church called Second Story Church; they remain in the Free Grace United Network. Free Grace United also began a partnership with Pastors Timothy and Teresa Nyandika, pastors of four churches in Kenya, who integrated their four churches with Free Grace United. The church also resumed its ministry to Mille Lacs County Jail inmates which had been closed due to the COVID-19 pandemic.

2022 - Pastor Ehtsham of Pakistan officially became a Free Grace United Pastor and launched two FGU churches in Pakistan. In February, FGU purchased Pine Lake Camps from Converge and began conducting ministry for children and youth in the state of Iowa. In April, an FGU church was launched in Eldora, IA. In September two more churches were launched in Albia, IA and Chariton, IA.

Ministries and outreach

Free Grace Bible College
Free Grace Bible College (formerly known as The Crossing College) began in 2013 to provide an opportunity for people to grow in their faith. This is a church-based college that meets once a week. Courses teach Biblical and Theological Studies, Leadership and Ministry Training, Personal Development and Spiritual Formation, and Internship through two programs: a Diploma in Biblical Studies or an associate degree in Christian Leadership and Ministry.

TWIRL 
In 2010, Pastor Kelly Dykstra started TWIRL, the first women's ministry at Free Grace United. According to the church's website, "The purpose of TWIRL is to thrill the women of Free Grace United (and their friends) with the truth of their unique design from God, and to move them to TWIRL – with open arms, generous hearts, and meaningful friendships that together will change the world."  Through TWIRL, the women of Free Grace United joined to support the A21 Campaign to help in efforts to abolish human trafficking and the sex slave trade.  They have also raised money for various local and global initiatives.

Free Grace Recovery
Free Grace Recovery is a 12-step, faith-based recovery group that "gives people a safe place to find freedom from anything: from past pain and present struggles to hard-core addictions."   Hundreds of people in the Elk River area, including many teenagers, have found freedom from all kinds of addictions through the program.

Pine Lake Camps
In 2022, FGU purchased Pine Lake Camps in Eldora, Iowa. Pine Lake Camps was originally founded in 1956 by Converge North Central. The current facility has 49 acres, 34 buildings, an in-ground swimming pool, high ropes course, 200 seat chapel, and a pastor's retreat cabin, along with a variety of outdoor activities. Over the past 60+ years, Pine Lake Camps has hosted many adults and students with retreats and summer camp, with an average of 500 campers each summer. Over the camp's decades-long ministry, thousands of people have professed decisions to follow Jesus.

Teresa Mission Center
FGU helps support an orphanage in Kenya which is led and operated by Pastor Timothy and Teresa Nyandika, pastors at the FGU churches in Kenya. This mission center presently houses 50 kids of all ages. In 2022, their  first child from the Mission Center was accepted to University.

Published works

Books

Grace on Tap
Pastor Eric Dykstra released his first book, Grace on Tap, in Fall of 2013. The book explains how God's approval does not depend on behavior; God's grace is free and unlimited for followers of Jesus.

The People Mover
Pastor Kelly Dykstra's book The People Mover was released in May 2015. The People Mover describes an "effortless faith" that occurs when you choose to let God carry you through life instead of relying solely on your own efforts.

Unhooked and Untangled
Pastor Eric Dykstra and Pastor Bruce Rauma of Legacy Church co-wrote Unhooked & Untangled: A Guide to Finding Freedom from your Vices, Addictions, and Bad Habits in June 2014. Unhooked and Untangled is a practical, step-by-step guide to breaking addictions and walking into the "full and satisfying life that God has for you."

How To Twirl: A Lovely Way to Live
Pastor Kelly Dykstra's book How To Twirl: A Lovely Way to Live was released in April 2017. Readers are encouraged to "Treat this guide as if you’re sitting down with a big cup of coffee and your very best friend so she can pour wisdom into your life."

Who Am I?: Why Am I Here? How Do I Live It Out?
Published in 2019, Pastor Silas Austin's book was written to help people find answers to the biggest questions in life.

God's Perspective: 60 Important Topics and What God's Word Says about Them
Senior Pastor Eric Dykstra published a book in April 2021 "to give Jesus-followers the places in Scripture where God addresses many of our biggest questions in life".

What Is the Bible?
In 2021, Pastor Karli Phelps published a book to be an "interactive crash course on the Good Book".

Albums

Grace is Life
Free Grace Worship's first full-length album, Grace is Life, was created and produced at Free Grace United by church staff and volunteers. It contains music that attempts to "resonate with our culture and the good news of God's grace".

Found My Worth
The songs on Free Grace Worships's second album are meant to encourage worshippers while reminding them that Jesus' sacrifice on the cross is what determines each individual's value.

Start a Fire
This album, produced in October 2019, includes 13 tracks, most of which are Free Grace Worship originals.

Affiliations
Converge

References 

Churches in Minnesota